Josef Bauer (12 January 1934 – 3 March 2022) was an Austrian artist.

Life and work
Bauer was born in Wels, Austria, on 12 January 1934. After his studies of painting in the school of arts in Linz, the main artistic style of his works became the so-called tactile poetry. In 1994 Bauer was awarded the cultural award of Linz and one year later the cultural award of Upper Austria for fine arts.

Bauer died on 3 March 2022, at the age of 88.

Exhibitions (extract)
 2005 Galerie Eder, "Die 70er Jahre", Linz
 2002 Galerie Atrium, "Bilder, Objekte Installationen", Kremsmünster
 1998 Galerie MAERZ, "Hinzufügungen", Linz
 1994 Bielefelder Kunstverein
 1992 OÖ. Landesgalerie, Linz
 1990 Studio allerArt, [Dorn]
 1986 Galerie Flutlicht, Vienna
 1985 Stadtgalerie Bielefeld
 1979 Kunstmuseum Hannover
 1978 Galerie Nächst St. Stephan, Vienna
 Galerie Festetics, Salzburg
 1974 Neue Galerie am Landesmuseum Joanneum, Graz
 1970 Galerie im Griechenbeisl, Vienna
 1968 Schloß Parz bei Grieskirchen
 Galerie im Griechenbeisl, Vienna

Bibliography
 Farbnamen with a preface by Burghard Schmidt. (Linz 2005)
 Farbnamen (Linz: Eigenverlag, 2004)
 Bilder, Objekte, Installationen, 1985–1998. (Linz 1998)
 Ausstellungskatalog. (Linz: Landesgalerie, 1992)
 Zeile für Zeile / Line by Line. Monographie. (Linz: edition neue texte, 1977)
 Taktile Poesie 1965 bis 1974. Ausstellungskatalog. (Graz: Neue Glaerie am Landesmuseum Johanneum Graz, 1974)
 Hinstellungen. Ausstellungskatalog. (Vienna: Galerie im Griechenbeisl, 1968)

References

External links
 Official Homepage of Josef Bauer

1934 births
2022 deaths
20th-century Austrian male artists
21st-century Austrian male artists
Austrian sculptors
Austrian painters
Austrian installation artists
People from Wels